The Tiwari ministry was the Cabinet of Uttarakhand while it was headed by the Chief Minister of Uttarakhand, N. D. Tiwari from 2002–2007.

Council of Ministers
Here is the list of cabinet ministers.

Former Ministers

References

Uttarakhand ministries
2002 establishments in Uttarakhand
Cabinets established in 2002
Indian National Congress state ministries
Indian National Congress of Uttarakhand
Cabinets disestablished in 2007
2007 disestablishments in India